Adam Christopher Butler (born August 17, 1973) is a former Major League Baseball pitcher. He played one season with the Atlanta Braves in 1998.

References

External links

1973 births
Atlanta Braves players
Major League Baseball pitchers
Living people
Baseball players from Virginia
Sportspeople from Fairfax, Virginia
Eugene Emeralds players
Florence Flame players
Macon Braves players
Durham Bulls players
Greenville Braves players
Richmond Braves players
Somerset Patriots players
Atlantic City Surf players
St. George Pioneerzz players
Newark Bears players
William & Mary Tribe baseball players
American expatriate baseball players in Taiwan
Sinon Bulls players